The PhD Project is a non-profit organization based in Montvale, New Jersey. It is a catalyst for African Americans, Hispanic Americans and Native Americans to return to academia to earn their doctorates and become business professors.

History

In 1993, a group of academics and corporate representatives sharing a concern for the lack of diversity in corporate hiring pools sought a solution. Over the next several months they initiated a systemic and fundamental program to correct a major problem: U.S. business school faculties consisted of less than two percent minorities.

With no faculty of color in the front of the classroom, colleges and universities could not attract minorities to study business disciplines. There were no role models and an absence of natural and approachable mentors. Something needed to be done. In response to this overwhelming need, The PhD Project was created. The founding members were The KPMG Foundation, The Association to Advance Collegiate Schools of Business (AACSB), Citigroup and the Graduate Management Admission Council (GMAC). The KPMG Foundation administers The Project and is the principal source of annual funding.

The program has been the principal reason for the increase in the number of African-American, Hispanic-American and Native American business school professors: in 1994 there were 294 minority business school professors, today there are 889. Furthermore, there are 412 members of these underrepresented groups now in doctoral programs that will lead to positions as professors.

Vision

The PhD Project's vision is a significantly larger pool of highly qualified African-Americans, Hispanic-Americans, and Native Americans for positions in management.

The PhD Project's mission is to increase the diversity of corporate America by increasing the diversity of business school faculty.  The PhD Project attracts African-Americans, Hispanic-Americans and Native Americans to business Ph.D. programs, and provides a network of peer support on their journey to becoming professors. As faculty, they serve as role models attracting and mentoring minority students while improving the preparation of all students for a diverse workplace and society.

Objectives

The main objectives of The PhD Project are:
 To inform and educate minorities about all aspects of a business doctoral program, and encourage them to follow their dream of becoming a professor; 
 To provide a nurturing support network for minorities as they navigate their doctoral program;
 To increase the number of minority business professors who can function as role models and mentors;
 To influence more minorities to pursue business degrees/careers;
 To increase the number of qualified minority applicants to fill critical positions in the business disciplines;
 To improve the preparation of all students by allowing them to experience the richness of learning from a faculty with diverse backgrounds; and
 To reach the goal of a better prepared and more diversified workforce to service a diversified customer base.

Approach

The PhD Project uses a three-pronged approach to increasing the population of minority business professors:

•	The first component of The PhD Project is a marketing campaign to identify a population of the best and brightest potential PhD candidates of color – via an extensive direct mail, print advertising and public relations campaign. Qualified candidates are invited to visit The Project web site and apply to The PhD Project annual conference.

•	The second component of The PhD Project is its annual conference. Qualified candidates are invited to this two-day annual conference where they hear from deans, professors and current minority doctoral students about the benefits of pursuing a business PhD.  At this time, candidates are exposed to more than 80 doctoral-granting universities that are represented during a four-hour exhibit show at the conference. Many of these candidates are recruited before they even enter a program.

•	The third component of the program is the Minority Doctoral Student Associations, formed by The PhD Project as a means of combating the high (25 percent) attrition rate inherent among all business doctoral students. Through these professional peer associations (in accounting, finance, information systems, management and marketing) minority doctoral students establish peer support relationships with others who are facing similar challenges on the way to becoming business school professors. Every minority business doctoral student in a full-time, AACSB-accredited program is a member of one of these associations. Each association has an annual conference held in conjunction with the relevant professional academic association.  There, the Ph.D. students receive guidance and information concerning every step of the process of earning the doctorate and obtaining employment. The retention rate of doctoral students who are members of these associations exceeds 90 percent.

Statistics

Recently, The PhD Project surveyed undergraduate and graduate students taking classes from minority professors and/or minority doctoral students to gauge the impact those instructors are having on minority and non-minority students’ education. The survey revealed that minority professors are having an astonishing impact on the career decisions of both minority and non-minority students. When asked, 83% of respondents said minority professors are positively impacting minority students’ employment or internship decisions. Almost 70% of respondents believe that they are impacting non-minority students’ employment or internship decisions, as well.

Sponsorship

The PhD Project is sponsored by a coalition of corporations and academic institutions. They are: KPMG Foundation, Graduate Management Admission Council, 179 Participating Universities, Citi Foundation, AACSB International, AICPA, Robert K. Elliott, Hewlett-Packard Company, JPMorgan Chase Foundation., DiversityInc., The Merck Company Foundation,  ACT-1 Group, Wal-Mart Stores, Inc, and Microsoft Corporation.

External links

Official site: http://www.phdproject.org
Sponsorship: http://phdproject.org/howtopartner.html
 Some Crucial Tips to Make Your PhD Thesis Better Than Better.

Non-profit organizations based in New Jersey